Christian Sandlie Sørum (born 3 December 1995) is a Norwegian beach volleyball player. He won the gold medal at the 2020 Olympics in Tokyo.

Beach career 
Sorum has been playing beach volleyball in national and international tournaments since 2011, starting CEV U18 with Knut-Ludvig Larsen and from 2012 with Bjarne Nikolai Huus, finishing 2nd in the FIVB U19 World Championship. With Runar Sannarnes in 2014 he became U22 European champion in Fehiye.

With Morten Kvamsdal he had his first top ten finish at the 2016 FIVB World Tour in Fortaleza and was ninth at the European Championships in Biel. Since the end of July 2016 Sorum plays with Anders Mol, with whom he finished fifth at the FIVB Major in Klagenfurt and won the U22 European Championship in Thessaloniki.

In 2017, Mol / Sorum took second place at the FIVB 5-Star-Tournament in Gstaad, won the CEV Masters in Ljubljana and finished fifth at the European Championships in Jurmala.

In 2018, they started again at the 4-star tournament in Den Haag with a fifth place. It was followed by many more top 10 finishes, including a fifth place in Xiamen, a second place in Itapema, a fifth place in Espinho and the victory in Gstaad.

In July, Mol/ Sorum became European Champions in the Netherlands. Then they also won the 5-star tournament in Vienna and climbed, after 19 victories in a row, at number one in the world rankings. Also at the World Tour Final in Hamburg Mol / Sorum emerged victorious. With that win the duo landed their forth FIVB World Tour gold medal in a row and earned them the highest ever prize money in the history of beach volleyball, taking home 150,000 $ in total. Sorum was awarded FIVB Best Defender for the 2018/2017 season.

The World Tour season 2018/19 was dominated by absolute dominance of Mol / Sorum. They won the 4-star tournaments in Las Vegas, Itapema, Jinjiang, Ostrava and finished second in Warsaw.

At the World Championships in Hamburg they retired in the semifinals against the German team Thole /Wickler and finished third in the end.
The following tournaments in Gstaad, Tokyo, and Vienna they could win again. At the European Championships in Moscow, Mol / Sorum defended their title. At the World Tour Finals in Rome, Mol/Sorum won a bronze medal. For the second year in a row, Sorum was awarded FIVB Best Defender. Mol/Sorum were also awarded FIVB Most Outstanding Men’s Team. 

In 2020, Mol / Sorum once again defended their European Championship title winning gold in Jurmala, Latvia. This win made them the third team in history to win a European Championship three years in a row. At 23 and 24 respectively they are the youngest team to achieve this feat.

At the 2020 Tokyo Olympics, the pair won gold medals, beating Russians Viacheslav Krasilnikov and Oleg Stoyanovskiy in the final.

They won gold at the 2021 European Championship in Vienna, becoming the first team to win it four times and the first team to win four consecutive times.

Indoor career 
Sorum played from 2012 to 2014 also indoor volleyball in the Norwegian youth / junior national team as an outside attacker. In the season 2013/14 he played with Forde VBK in the European Challenge Cup.

References

External links
 
 
 
 Christian Sandlie Sørum at RedBull.com
 
 
 

1995 births
Living people
Norwegian beach volleyball players
Sportspeople from Oslo
Beach volleyball players at the 2020 Summer Olympics
Olympic gold medalists for Norway
Medalists at the 2020 Summer Olympics
Olympic medalists in beach volleyball
Olympic beach volleyball players of Norway
21st-century Norwegian people